Edmund Pollexfen Bastard (12 July 1784 – 8 June 1838) was a British Tory politician, son of Edmund Bastard and his wife Jane Pownoll. He married Anne Jane Rodney, granddaughter of Admiral Rodney.

He succeeded his father as Member of Parliament (MP)  for Dartmouth from 1812 to 1816 when that seat was taken by his younger brother, John Bastard.

In the same election Edmund succeeded his uncle, John Pollexfen Bastard, as MP for Devonshire from 1816 to 1830.

He was appointed High Sheriff of Devon for 1834.

Disambiguation

John Pollexfen Bastard—John Bastard RN and Edmund Pollexfen Bastard—Edmund Bastard

References 

 John Burke, Bastard of Kitley, A Genealogical and Heraldic History of the Commoners of Great Britain and Ireland Henry Colburn London 1834.

External links 
 

1784 births
1838 deaths
Members of the Parliament of the United Kingdom for Dartmouth
Tory MPs (pre-1834)
Members of the Parliament of the United Kingdom for Devon
UK MPs 1812–1818
UK MPs 1818–1820
UK MPs 1820–1826
UK MPs 1826–1830
High Sheriffs of Devon